Kathai Thiraikathai Vasanam Iyakkam (also referred to as KTVI) is a 2014 Indian Tamil-language independent satirical drama film written and directed by R. Parthiepan and produced by K. Chandramohan and independent producer, Haresh Vikram Vijayakumar. The project stars an all-new cast along with several experienced actors in cameo roles and becomes Parthiepan's first directorial film in which he does not feature in the lead role. The film, which has a tagline reading "a film without a story", began production in late 2013 and was released on 15 August 2014.

Plot

The trope of the movie is that there is no plot. It simply narrates the events in the life of a crew of film-makers as they attempt to get to a story for their proposed movie and whether they succeed.

Cast
 Santhosh Prathap as Thamizh
 Akhila Kishore as Daksha
 Dinesh Natarajan as Arvind
 Lallu as Murthy
 Sahithya Jagannathan as Shirley
 Vijay Ram as Murali
  Mahalakshmi as Deepa / Roopa
 Thambi Ramaiah as Seenu

Guest appearances 
(in alphabetical order):

Aishwarya Rajesh
Arjun Nandhakumar
Arya
Ashwin Kumar Lakshmikanthan (deleted scene)
A. L. Azhagappan
Amala Paul
Arun Benny
Bharath
Cheran
Dhananjayan Govind
Disha
Ineya
Kalaignanam
Parthiepan
Prakash Raj
Raghava Lawrence
Roopa Shree
Sandra Amy
Shanthnu Bhagyaraj
Srikanth
Taapsee Pannu
Thaman
Venkat Prabhu
Vijay Sethupathi
Vimal
Vishal
Vishnu Raghav

Production
In February 2013, actor-director R. Parthiepan announced that he would write and direct his twelfth feature film and title it Kathai Thiraikathai Vasanam Iyakkam, noting that he would not act in the film, unlike his previous ventures. The film began its shoot in December 2013 after Parthiepan had completed his acting assignments, with a schedule taking place in Chennai.

While newcomers were signed for the lead roles, several popular actors from the Tamil film industry were offered to play cameo roles in the film. Vijay Sethupathi first shot scenes for a day and did not take any remuneration for his participation and Parthiepan stated that Arya, Amala Paul, Nazriya and Prakash Raj were the other actors who had agreed to make cameo appearances. Amala Paul was subsequently requested to appear in a cameo role and agreed to continue filming for scenes in Coimbatore. She shot along with Arya, whose role was also extended. Nazriya meanwhile got engaged and backed out of all her projects she had accepted, including Kathai Thiraikathai Vasanam Iyakkam and instead Taapsee Pannu worked on the film for one day. It was reported that Suriya and Dhanush were also approached which was not confirmed by the director, who instead informed that Vishal would act in a few scenes. One of the film's lead actresses was revealed to be Akhila Kishore, a model who had appeared in few Kannada films.

Soundtrack

The soundtrack album has four tracks composed by four different artists Alphons Joseph, Sharreth, Vijay Antony and S. Thaman. The title song by Alphons Joseph was released as a single on 12 May 2014 at Suriyan FM, the full album was launched on 25 May 2014. Parthiepan had stated that Yuvan Shankar Raja had agreed to compose a song for the film and that actress Simran had recorded a song in April 2014. The soundtrack album did not feature a song by neither artist, however. Actress Sneha also had recorded a song for the film, singing the pallavi and a charanam, but as she was displeased with the outcome, she suggested a professional singer replace her.

Release
The satellite rights of the film were sold to STAR Vijay.

Critical reception
Baradwaj Rangan of The Hindu wrote "For a good part, it just wants to make us laugh — and that it does very well. The one-liners and Parthiban’s trademark dialogues are funny enough to camouflage the fact that this is actually a pretty serious premise...Kathai Thiraikathai (Vasanam Iyakkam), for the most part, is borne along with rhythms that are slightly off-kilter, and it has the snap of a student film". The Times of India gave the film 3.5 stars out of 5 and wrote, "Radhakrishnan Parthiban and his films can sometimes come across as over-smart, and being quirky just for the sake of being so. But in Kathai Thiraikathai Vasanam Iyakkam, this over smartness and quirkiness lend freshness to a regular one-line plot. The film proudly wears these two elements on its sleeves and feels fresh and zany". The New Indian Express wrote, "With his refreshing screenplay and an unconventional narrative style Parthiepan makes a bold and successful attempt to veer cinema from its routine beaten path...the film packs enough punch to make it worthwhile for audiences, to experience a celluloid journey that is intriguing and fascinating. Kathai (Thiraikathai Vasanam Iyakkam) comes as a whiff of fresh air".

Sify wrote, "Kathai Thirakathai Vasanam Iyakkam...is fairly a decent and fresh approach to filmmaking...The film works largely on Parthipan’s smart writing and his humour laced sarcastic dialogues". Indiaglitz gave the film a rating of 3 and wrote, "in one of the most captivating screenplays of recent times, with hardly any concrete story to stick to and an unbelievable climax, Parthiepan has ensured that Kathai Thiraikathai Vasanam Iyakkam is one of a kind of an entertainer that glues you to the seat all the two and half hours, without any worry of the clock ticking". Behindwoods gave 2.75 stars out of 5 and wrote: "Sharp dialogues, wit, Thambi Ramiah and screenplay experimentation make KTVI a good ride".

References

External links
 

Films about filmmaking
Films about film directors and producers
Films about films
Films about actors
Indian nonlinear narrative films
Indian comedy films
2014 comedy films
2014 films
2010s Tamil-language films
Films directed by R. Parthiban
Films scored by Thaman S
Films scored by Vijay Antony
Films scored by C. Sathya
Films scored by Alphons Joseph
Films scored by Sharreth